Yassmin Alers is an American actress born in New York City's Spanish Harlem as the middle child of a close-knit family of five children. She was dance captain and understudy in the original broadway cast of Jonathan Larson's RENT on Broadway. She also appeared in the Broadway productions of Paul Simon's The Capeman and in the revival of The Rocky Horror Show.  Alers has appeared in the International Tour of The Who's Tommy and the National Tour of RENT. She most recently was on Broadway with On Your Feet and at GEVA Theater Center in Rochester with In The Heights, where she played the role of Abuela Claudia. Ms. Alers has a Bachelor of Science in Psychology.

Filmography
 West Side Story (2021) as Lluvia
 The American Mall (2008) (TV) as Erin
 Chain Link (2008) as Jade
 Across the Universe (2007) as Harlot
 The Ten Commandments: The Musical (2006) as Ensemble

External links
 Official site
 Broadway World
 

American stage actresses
Year of birth missing (living people)
Living people
People from East Harlem
21st-century American women